Museum August Kestner, previously Kestner-Museum, is a museum in Hanover, Germany. It was founded in 1889. The museum was renamed Museum August Kestner in December 2007 to avoid confusion with the Kestnergesellschaft, a local art gallery.

Museum August Kestner is centered on the collections of August Kestner and his nephew Hermann Kestner, later followed by the collections of Friedrich Culemann and Friedrich Wilhelm von Bissing. It contains four different categories of antiquities: Ancient Egypt, Classical Antiquity, Numismatics and Handicraft.

Further reading 
 Ulrich Gehrig (editor.): 100 Jahre Kestner-Museum Hannover. 1889–1989. Kestner-Museum, Hannover 1989, 
 Handschriften des Kestner-Museums zu Hannover (= Mittelalterliche Handschriften in Niedersachsen.  11) / Beschrieben von Helmar Härtel, Wiesbaden 1999, 
 Das geheimnisvolle Grab 63 : die neueste Entdeckung im Tal der Könige ; Archäologie und Kunst von Susan Osgood; [anlässlich der Ausstellung "Das Geheimnisvolle Grab 63 – die Neueste Entdeckung im Tal der Könige. Archäologie und Kunst von Susan Osgood" im Ägyptischen Museum der Rheinischen Friedrich-Wilhelms-Universität Bonn vom 27. November 2009 bis 30. Mai 2010 und im Museum August Kestner, Hannover vom 1. Juli bis 7. November 2010] = The mysterious tomb 63 / hrsg. von Eberhard Dziobek ... Mit Beitr. von Marianne Eaton-Krauss ... Übers.: Daniela Hofmann ...], Rahden/Westf. 2009
 Simone Vogt: Die Münzen des Augustus im Museum August Kestner : [anlässlich der Ausstellung "Kaiser – Krieger – Schlachtverlierer. Die Münzen des Augustus im Museum August Kestner" vom 25. Juni bis 20. September 2009] / [Hrsg.: Landeshauptstadt Hannover, Der Oberbürgermeister, Museum August Kestner. Bearb. und Red.: Simone Vogt. Übers. des Essays ins Engl.: Daniela Hofmann], Rahden/Westf. 2009
 Die Pflanzen im altägyptischen Garten : ein Bestandskatalog der ägyptischen Sammlung im Museum August Kestner ; [anlässlich der Ausstellung "Unweit von Eden: Altägyptische Gärten – Paradiese der Wüste" im Museum August Kestner Hannover, vom 24. September 2009 bis 10. Januar 2010] / by Christian E. Loeben and Sven Kappel (botanical texts), with intro. by Dieter Eigner ... [Ed.: Landeshauptstadt Hannover, Der Oberbürgermeister ; Museum August Kestner], Rahden/Westf. 2009, 
 Werner Seibt: Ein Blick in die byzantinische Gesellschaft : die Bleisiegel im Museum August Kestner, Rahden/Westf 2011 
 Britta Rabe: Zwischen Entwurf und Produkt. Die griechisch-römischen Gipsformen aus Ägypten im Museum August Kestner, mit einer CD-ROM der abgebildeten Museumsobjekte (= Philippika. 44), Wiesbaden 2011,

External links 

German language webpage

 
Museums in Hanover
Buildings and structures in Hanover
Decorative arts museums in Germany
Ethnographic museums in Germany
Numismatic museums in Germany
Egyptological collections in Germany
Museums established in 1889
1889 establishments in Germany
Tourist attractions in Hanover